The following is a list of notable events and releases that happened in Scandinavian music in 2021. (Go to last year in Scandinavian music or next year in Scandinavian music.)

Events

January
7 January – The death of Finnish guitarist Alexi Laiho is announced on social media by members of his band Bodom After Midnight. It is reported that Laiho had "suffered from long-term health issues during his last years".
12 January – Finnish musician Marko Hietala announces that he is leaving Nightwish and retiring from public life as a result of disillusionment and concerns about his mental health.
22 January – Papa Emeritus IV is introduced to the public on the TV game show "På spåret", performing with The Hellacopters.
25 January – Swedish musician Snowy Shaw announces that he will release one song per month during 2021, making up a digital album.

February
20 February 
 In the final of Melodi Grand Prix 2021, the 59th edition of Norway's national selection competition for the Eurovision Song Contest, Tix is selected as the country's representative, with the song "Fallen Angel".
 In the Uuden Musiikin Kilpailu 2021, the 10th edition of Finland's national selection competition for the Eurovision Song Contest, the rock group Blind Channel are selected as the country's representatives, with their song "Dark Side".

March
13 March
 At Melodifestivalen 2021, the 61st edition of the Swedish music competition, Tusse is selected as Sweden's entrant, with the song "Voices", composed by Joy Deb, Linnea Deb, Jimmy "Joker" Thörnfeldt and Anderz Wrethov. The Mamas, who had been selected as the 2020 entrants, with "Move", also competed in the final, with a new song, "In the Middle", but finished in third place.
Iceland's Eurovision representatives, Daði og Gagnamagnið, release "10 Years", the song chosen as the country's entry.

May
30 April – Finnish rock band Before the Dawn release their first single since reforming after their 2013 break-up.

May
19 May – It is announced that two members of Gagnamagnið, Iceland's competitors at the Eurovision Song Contest, have tested positive for COVID-19, meaning that their appearance in the semi-final and final have to be based on footage from their rehearsal at Rotterdam Ahoy, recorded on 13 May.
20 May – In the second semi-final of the Eurovision Song Contest 2021, Denmark fail to qualify for the final. 
22 May – In the final of the Eurovision Song Contest 2021, held in Rotterdam, Netherlands, Iceland finish in 4th place, Finland in 6th place, Sweden in 14th place, and Norway in 18th place.

June
16 June – Copenhell festival was scheduled to begin on this date, with a line-up including Judas Priest, Opeth and The Hu, but was cancelled because of continuing COVID-19 restrictions.
22 June – Mia Winter Wallace rejoins Abbath.

July
7 July – Bingsjöstämning, an annual folk festival held near Uppsala, Sweden, takes place online, the live festival having been cancelled because of continuing COVID-19 restrictions.

August
13 August – Mikael Stanne announces that longtime drummer Anders Jivarp and bassist Anders Iwers will be leaving the Swedish metal band Dark Tranquillity.
26 August – ABBA launch a new website, containing information about their forthcoming new album.

October
October – Tarja Turunen produces her autobiography, Singing in My Blood.

November
5 November - ABBA release Voyage, their first album of new material in 40 years.  
ABBA's new single, is nominated for a Grammy award in the "Record of the Year" category, the group's first-ever nomination.

Albums released

January

February

March

April

May

June

July

August

September

October

November

December

Eurovision Song Contest
 Denmark in the Eurovision Song Contest 2021
 Finland in the Eurovision Song Contest 2021
 Iceland in the Eurovision Song Contest 2021
 Norway in the Eurovision Song Contest 2021
 Sweden in the Eurovision Song Contest 2021

Classical works
 Anna S. Þorvaldsdóttir – Catamorphosis
Klas Torstensson – City Imprints

Deaths
10 January – Thorleif Torstensson, 71, Swedish singer (COVID-19)
16 January – Pave Maijanen, 70, Finnish musician (complications from amyotrophic lateral sclerosis)
13 February – Eva Nässén, 74, Swedish singer and teacher
1 March – Hauk Buen, 87, Norwegian hardingfele fiddler and fiddle maker
7 March – Lars-Göran Petrov, 49, Swedish singer (cancer)
4 May – Henrik Ohlin, Swedish bassist (Black Ingvars). (death announced on this date)
10 May 
Lars-Gunnar Bodin, 85, Swedish electronic music pioneer
Svante Thuresson, 84, Swedish jazz musician
25 May – Søren Holm, 25, Danish singer (Liss).
2 June – Carl Høgset, 79, Norwegian choral conductor and singer
9 June – Torgny Björk, 82, Swedish musician, composer and singer.
27 June – Peps Persson, 74, Swedish blues and reggae musician and social critic
20 July – Curt-Eric Holmquist, 73, conductor and Eurovision Song Contest winner
4 August – Anders Pettersson, 69, Swedish musician (Lasse Stefanz)
16 September – Geir Johnson, 67, Norwegian composer and musicologist
19 September – Mats Paulson, 83, Swedish singer, poet and songwriter
30 September – Lennart Åberg, 79, Swedish jazz musician and composer
9 October – Jim Pembroke, 75, British-born vocalist of Finnish band Wigwam
21 October – Einár, 19, Swedish rapper (shot)
27 October – Benjamin Vallé, 47, Swedish musician (Viagra Boys).
11 November – Per Aage Brandt, 77, Danish writer, poet, linguist and musician
19 November – Hank von Hell, 49, Norwegian punk rock singer
28 November – Laila Halme, 87, Finnish singer
17 December – Torhild Staahlen, 74, Norwegian operatic mezzo-soprano

References

Scandinavian
Scandinavian culture